Saeid Pirdoost (Persian: سعید پیردوست) is born January 6, 1941 Tehran, Iran. He is an Iranian actor.

Filmography
Gavazn-ha  (The Deer) 
Snake Fang
Dast-haye Aloode
Delbar-e Ahani
Karagah Alavi (Detective Alavi)
Dokhtar-e shirini forush (The Confectioner Girl)
Tokyo bedoone tavaghof (Tokyo none-stop)
Pavarchin (On Tiptoe)
Noghtechin (Dotting)
Oxygen
Jayezeye Bozorg (Grand Prize)
Shabhaye Barareh (Barareh Nights)
Baghe Mozaffar (Mozaffar's Garden)
Marde Hezar Chehreh (Thousand-Face Man)
Ghahve-ye Talkh (Bitter Coffee)
Killing a Traitor

See also
 Mehran Modiri
 Siamak Ansari

References

External links 

Iranian male television actors
Iranian male film actors
People from Tehran
Living people
1941 births